Albert Edward Goldthorpe (3 November 1871 – 8 January 1943) was an English rugby footballer from the period around 1895's schism in English rugby, which led to the formation of rugby league football around the turn of the century.

Career
He went on to become one of the best known figures in English rugby, both before and after the split, and he was one of the finest individual talents in the game at the time of the Northern Union's formation in 1895. He was also a successful cricketer, captaining the team for several years. 

Goldthorpe was still playing for Hunslet twenty years after his debut, when in the 1907-08 season he led the club to unprecedented success, winning all four cups (the Challenge Cup, the Championship, the Yorkshire Cup and the Yorkshire League). Hunslet were the first team to achieve that feat.

Albert Goldthorpe played  in Hunslet's 14-0 victory over Hull F.C. in the 1907–08 Challenge Cup Final during the 1907–08 season at Fartown Ground, Huddersfield on Saturday 25 April 1908, in front of a crowd of 18,000.

Albert Goldthorpe played  in Hunslet's 13-3 victory over Halifax in the 1905–06 Yorkshire County Cup Final during the 1905–06 season at Park Avenue, Bradford on Saturday 2 December 1905, and played , and scored 3-drop goals in the 17-0 victory over Halifax in the 1907–08 Yorkshire County Cup Final during the 1907–08 season at Headingley Rugby Stadium, Leeds on Saturday 21 December 1907.

When he finally retired in 1910, Goldthorpe had scored more goals and points than any player in the game's history at that time. He had played at least 713 games for Hunslet, scoring over 80 tries and kicking over 1000 goals. After his playing career ended he served on the Hunslet committee until, in 1924, he was appointed as the club's second full-time secretary-manager, a post he held for seven years. He had been a member of the committee from at least 15th Nov, 1895, along with his brother James.  Albert farmed Urn Farm on Middleton Road, Belle Isle, Leeds and is buried in Hunslet Cemetery nearby.

Legacy
Goldthorpe died in 1942 aged 72.

In 1988 an Australian television movie, The First Kangaroos actor Dennis Waterman's villainous depiction of Goldthorpe drew formal complaints from Goldthorpe's granddaughter.

In 2008, the Albert Goldthorpe Medal was created by British rugby league newspaper Rugby Leaguer & League Express to honour the leading players in the Super League.

On 20 August 2009, transport company Arriva Yorkshire honoured 13 rugby league footballers at a ceremony at The Jungle, the home of the Castleford Tigers. A fleet of new buses were named after the 'Arriva Yorkshire Rugby League Dream Team'. Members of the public nominated the best ever rugby league footballers to have played in West Yorkshire, supported by local rugby league journalists; James Deighton from BBC Leeds, and Tim Butcher, editor of Rugby League World. The 'Arriva Yorkshire Rugby League Dream Team' is; Trevor Foster MBE, Neil Fox MBE, Albert Goldthorpe, Alan Hardisty, Stan Kielty, Lewis Jones, Roger Millward MBE, Malcolm Reilly, Garry Schofield, Keith Senior, David Topliss, Dave Valentine and Adrian Vowles.

References

External links
Albert Goldthorpe, The Goldthorpe Brothers, Retrieved 25 May 2015

1871 births
1943 deaths
English rugby league players
English rugby union players
Hunslet F.C. (1883) players
People from Hunslet
Rugby league five-eighths
Rugby league halfbacks
Rugby league players from Leeds
Rugby union players from Leeds